Michael William Bowyer Nonni (born 10 November 1989) is a Canadian former professional soccer player who most recently played with FC Edmonton of the North American Soccer League.

Career

Youth and college 
Born in West Vancouver, British Columbia, Nonni spent four years at the Vancouver Selects for which he had played abroad with the team against teams like Manchester United, Ajax, Roma, and AC Milan. He then spent three seasons in college at the UC Santa Barbara for which he played for the soccer team, the UC Santa Barbara Gauchos.

After spending two seasons at college Nonni went to Germany to play semi-professionally for SV Wilhelmshaven of the Regionalliga Nord. He made his debut for Wilhelmshaven on 19 February 2012 against RB Leipzig at the Red Bull Arena in which he started and played 46 minutes as Wilhelmshaven suffered an 8–2 defeat.

Professional 
On 30 July 2012 it was announced that Nonni had arrived for a trial at FC Edmonton of the North American Soccer League. He then officially signed a professional contract with FC Edmonton during pre-season of 2013.

Nonni made his professional debut for FC Edmonton on 28 April 2013 against the San Antonio Scorpions at Clarke Stadium in which he came on as a 78th-minute substitute for Robert Garrett as FC Edmonton won the match 1–0. 

Nonni was released by Edmonton on 28 January 2016.

Career statistics

References

External links 
 
 FC Edmonton player profile
 UC Santa Barbara player profile

1989 births
Living people
People from West Vancouver
Soccer people from British Columbia
Canadian soccer players
Association football midfielders
North American Soccer League players
UC Santa Barbara Gauchos men's soccer players
SV Wilhelmshaven players
FC Edmonton players
University of British Columbia alumni
Canadian expatriate soccer players
Canadian expatriate sportspeople in the United States
Expatriate soccer players in the United States
Canadian expatriate sportspeople in Germany
Expatriate footballers in Germany